Visitors to Iran must obtain a visa from one of the Iranian diplomatic missions unless they come from one of the visa exempt countries or countries eligible for a visa on arrival. All visitors must hold a passport valid for at least six months.

Overview
Iranian authorities are exploring a potential visa waiver program under which visa limitations for 60 countries will be lifted as part of Iran's program to attract more tourists.

Dual citizens of both Iran and another country count as citizens of Iran when visiting, and must have an Iranian passport. This includes children of Iranian citizens born outside of Iran.

Iran no longer affixes visas to passports nor stamps them on entry as a response to the US sanctions on persons who have visited Iran after 2011. In November 2018, the head of Iran's Cultural Heritage, Handicrafts, and Tourism Organization (ICHTO), announced that the country will no longer stamp or put stickers to passports of foreign tourists in a bid to ease their concerns about traveling to other countries after leaving Iran. In June 2019 the President of Iran ordered the Interior Ministry to implement the decision on not stamping passports of foreigners.

Travel restrictions related to the COVID-19 pandemic 
Due to the COVID-19 pandemic, the Iranian Ministry of Foreign Affairs has halted permits for all Tourist visas. “By the order of President [Seyyed Ebrahim Raisi] the issuance of tourist visas and the flow of foreign tourists from land and air borders will be resumed from [the month of] Aban (Oct. 23 – Nov. 21) following 19 months of suspension,” Cultural Heritage, Tourism and Handicrafts Minister Ezatollah Zarghami said.
Iran is open now, and all Iran borders including sea and land borders are open to all tourists who received their two doses of vaccines, except the United Kingdom, France, and African countries, including Zimbabwe, Mozambique, Namibia, Malawi, South Africa, Swatini, Lesotho and Botswana.(January 11-2022 updates)

After an Iranian visa is received during COVID-19 pandemic, the following are required for entrance: a vaccine certification for two doses of valid COVID-19 vaccines no earlier than 14 days of arrival, a negative COVID-19 PCR test, issued at most 72 hours before arrival for all passengers over 12 years old, and a completed self-declaration form on inbound flights.

Visa policy map
In the visa policy map below you can see the visa requirements for different countries around the world.

Visa-free
Citizens of the following 16 jurisdictions can visit Iran without a visa:

1 – 90 days within 180 days.
2 – only for arriving by air directly from Damascus.

 and  signed visa-waiver agreement on 21 February 2022.

Iran free trade zones
All tourists may stay on Kish Island, Qeshm Island, or other free trade zones for 14 days or less without obtaining any visa. Americans, Canadians, and Britons are only required to have a certified escort guide waiting for them upon their arrival. Must obtain hotel reservations before your arrival. Overall, you can visit the following trade zones for up to 2 weeks without a visa in 2022:

Arvand Free Zone
Aras Free Zone
Chabahar Free Trade-Industrial Zone
Maku, Iran
Qeshm Island
Kish Island
Anzali

Kish and Qeshm Islands
All tourists, may stay on Kish Island or Qeshm Island for up to 14 days without obtaining any visa. Citizens of the United States, Canada, and the UK are only required to have a certified escort guide waiting for them upon their arrival. The guide has to have the hotel-reservation letters of the passenger with them and let the immigration office of the airport know about the arrival of the passenger 48 hours before arrival.

Diplomatic and service category passports

Holders of passports issued by the following countries are allowed to enter Iran without a visa.

D — diplomatic passports
O — official passports
S — service passports
Sp — special passports

Iran Visa for American, British, Canadian and Colombian Citizens
Holders of American, British, Canadian and Colombian passports can also visit Iran with an Iran tourism visa. The visa procedure for these nationalities takes around eight weeks. They also have to plan and book their trip with a certified local travel agency in Iran. Before the visa can be issued, the agency has to submit the applicant's day-by-day itinerary to the foreign ministry for approval. American and Canadian spouses of Iranian Citizens can easily obtain family visas of up to ninety (90) days to visit and stay in the country without the need for an agency.

Visa application and requirements
Iran's tourist visa is issued for up to 30 days and can have up to two additional 30-day extensions, for a total of 90 days. To get a visa prior to arrival, a Visa Authorization Code must be applied for through the Iranian Ministry of Foreign Affair's e-visa website or an Iranian travel agency. The amount of the visa fee is dependent upon one's nationality. The visa fee must be paid prior to pick-up or when applying for a VOA. Local Iranian travel agencies offer better support, trackability and convenience for an additional fee.

Upon receiving a Visa Authorization Code, the visa may be collected at one of Iran's worldwide embassies and consulates prior to arrival or upon arrival at one of Iran's international airports. Most nationalities, except American, British and Canadian passport holders, can also obtain their tourist visa upon their arrival in the form of a Visa-On-Arrival (VOA) at the airport without a prior application. Although this method is convenient for last-minute travelers, it does have a higher risk of rejection and tends to be more time-consuming.

Visa on arrival
Holders of normal passports travelling as tourists can obtain a visa on arrival for a maximum stay of 30 days (extendable), at the following airports, as of January 2018:

Bandar Abbas International Airport (Bandar Abbas)
Isfahan International Airport (Isfahan)
Kish International Airport (Kish Island)
Mashhad International Airport (Mashad)
Qeshm International Airport (Qeshm Island)
Shiraz International Airport (Shiraz)
Tabriz International Airport (Tabriz)
Imam Khomeini International Airport (Tehran)
Mehrabad International Airport (Tehran)
Urmia Airport (Urmia)
Ahvaz International Airport (Ahvaz)
Kerman Airport (Kerman)
Larestan International Airport (Lar)

Note: to obtain a visa on arrival, passengers must already have made an application, at least two days before arrival, at the Iranian Ministry of Foreign Affair's E-Visa website and present the submission notification at the airport's visa desk on arrival.

Iran plans to increase the length of stay from one month to three months. Visas on arrival will be available at Shahid Sadooghi Airport in the near future.

Price: Getting a visa on arrival at Tehran airport is very straightforward. The Iran visa on arrival costs 75 euros + 3 USD bank commission. The visa fees are different depending on the passport. But usually, it is always based on a 75 euros fee. 

Visa on arrival does not apply to nationals of the following countries who must obtain a visa in advance:

Passport holders of these countries are required to apply for an Iranian visa at an Iranian embassy or consulate before they arrive in Iran.

 Shahid Rajaee Port
Marine travelers entering Iran via Shahid Rajaee Port in the southern Hormozgan Province can also receive a visa on arrival.

Electronic visa
E-visas have been available since 22 November 2018.

Mandatory guides
Canadian, British, and US citizens are required to be escorted by a government-approved guide at all times. Independent travel for these citizens has been banned due to the closure of Iranian foreign missions in these countries.

Israel

Entry and transit is refused for Israel nationals, even if not leaving the aircraft and proceeding by the same flight. Entry and transit is also refused to holders of passports or travel documents containing an Israeli visa or stamp (less than 365 days) or any data showing that the visitor has been to Israel or has indication of any connection with the state of Israel.

See also

Visa requirements for Iranian citizens
Tourism in Iran

References

External links

 IR-IRAN Electronic Visa (Iran eVisa) Application System 
 Ministry of Foreign Affairs of I.R.Iran

Iran
Foreign relations of Iran